Russian River may refer to any of the following:

 Russian River (Alaska), a river in Alaska
 Russian River (California), a river in California

See also
List of rivers of Russia
Russian River Valley AVA, California wine region in Sonoma County